Rodrigo Acosta (born May 5, 1990) is an Argentine association football forward currently playing for Deportes Concepción of the Primera División B in Chile.

Teams
  Los Andes 2008-2011
  Deportes Concepción 2012–present
Sacachispas 2015 - 2018
Almirante Brown 2018 - 2020
Comunicaciones 2021 - Presente

References

 Profile at BDFA 

1990 births
Living people
Argentine expatriate footballers
Argentine footballers
Club Atlético Los Andes footballers
Deportes Concepción (Chile) footballers
Primera B de Chile players
Expatriate footballers in Chile
Association football forwards
People from Lomas de Zamora
Sportspeople from Buenos Aires Province